Emily Rose Geach (born 15 February 2004) is an English cricketer who currently plays for Cornwall and Western Storm. She plays as a right-arm medium bowler.

Domestic career
Geach made her county debut in 2018, for Cornwall against Dorset. She went on to take 5 wickets at an average of 18.20 in the 2018 Women's County Championship, and 7 wickets at an average of 7.14 in the 2018 Women's Twenty20 Cup. The following season, she again took 5 wickets in the County Championship and 7 wickets in the Twenty20 Cup. She took two wickets in the 2021 Women's Twenty20 Cup and three wickets in the 2022 Women's Twenty20 Cup.

Geach was named in the Western Storm Academy squad in 2021 and 2022. She was promoted to the first team squad in September 2022, making her debut for the side on 18 September, against North West Thunder in the Rachael Heyhoe Flint Trophy.

References

External links

2004 births
Living people
Place of birth missing (living people)
Cornwall women cricketers
Western Storm cricketers